"Tres" (Eng.: Three) is the title of a pop song written and performed by Colombian singer-songwriter Juanes. This song was released as the third single from his fourth studio album La Vida... Es un Ratico.

Track listing
This information from Allmusic.
Album version – 3:25
Full Phat Remix – 3:48

Chart performance

References

2008 singles
Juanes songs
Songs written by Juanes
Song recordings produced by Gustavo Santaolalla
Spanish-language songs
Universal Music Latino singles
2007 songs